Stratus (originally "Clive Burr's Escape", then briefly known as "Tygon" and "Stratas"), was a short-lived English melodic hard rock supergroup. It was formed by ex-Iron Maiden drummer Clive Burr, the Troy brothers from then-inactive Praying Mantis; plus ex-Grand Prix vocalist Bernie Shaw and keyboardist Alan Nelson.  The band split after only one album, Throwing Shapes, released in 1985.  Bernie Shaw became the lead vocalist for Uriah Heep the following year.

The track "Run for Your Life" was featured on the soundtrack to the movie, Class of Nuke 'Em High.

Discography

 Throwing Shapes - 1985
 "Back Street Lovers" (3:51)
 "Gimme Something" (4:14)
 "Even if It Takes" (4:22)
 "Give Me One More Chance" (4:47)
 "Never Say No" (4:01)
 "Romancer" (3:22)
 "Enough Is Enough" (3:40)
 "Run for Your Life" (4:33)
 "So Tired" (4:46)

Line-up
 Bernie Shaw - lead vocals
 Tino Troy — lead guitar, vocals
 Alan Nelson — keyboard
 Chris Troy — bass, vocals
 Clive Burr - drums, vocals

See also
List of new wave of British heavy metal bands

References

External links
 Praying Mantis: Side projects
 Praying Mantis: Stratus

English hard rock musical groups
British supergroups
Rock music supergroups
New Wave of British Heavy Metal musical groups